Back in Black is the seventh studio album by Australian hard rock band AC/DC. 

Back in Black may also refer to:

 "Back in Black" (song), the title track of the album by AC/DC
 Back in Black (Cypress Hill album), a 2022 album by Cypress Hill
 Back in Black (Whodini album), the third album by American hip hop group Whodini
 Spider-Man: Back in Black, a 5-part Marvel Comics storyline about the fictional superhero Spider-Man
 Back in Black (novel), the fifth novel in the A-List series by Zoey Dean
 "Back in Black" (Power Rangers), the fifth episode of Power Rangers: Dino Thunder
 "Back in Black with Lewis Black", a recurring segment of The Daily Show
 "Back in Black", the tagline of the 2002 film Men in Black II
 "Back in Black", the season 3 premiere of the incomplete animated show Generator Rex
 "Back in Black", an episode of the 2012 animated show Ultimate Spider-Man

See also
 Back to Black (disambiguation)